The Authentic Revolutionary Nationalist Movement (Spanish: Movimiento Nacionalista Revolucionario Auténtico, MNRA) was a small right-wing political party in Bolivia.

The Authentic Revolutionary Nationalist Movement broke away from the Authentic Revolutionary Party in 1962.

It elected one deputy of National Congress on 4 June 1962.

After the coup d'état on 4 November 1964 the Authentic Revolutionary Nationalist Movement disappeared.

Notes

1962 establishments in Bolivia
1964 disestablishments in Bolivia
Defunct political parties in Bolivia
Nationalist parties in Bolivia
Political parties disestablished in 1964
Political parties established in 1962
Revolutionary Nationalist Movement breakaway groups